South La Paloma is an unincorporated community and census-designated place in Jim Wells County, Texas, United States. Its population was 345 as of the 2010 census. Prior to 2010, the community was grouped with nearby Alfred as part of the Alfred-South La Paloma census-designated place.

Geography

Education
It is in the Orange Grove Independent School District.

References

Unincorporated communities in Jim Wells County, Texas
Unincorporated communities in Texas
Census-designated places in Jim Wells County, Texas
Census-designated places in Texas